is a Japanese idol girl group. They participated in the 2015 Tokyo Idol Festival. Their single "Biba ra Sanba" reached the 20th place on the Weekly Oricon Singles Chart.

Discography

Albums

Singles

Notes

References

External links
 

Japanese idol groups
Japanese girl groups